IEC 61162 is a collection of IEC standards for "Digital interfaces for navigational equipment within a ship".

The 61162 standards are developed in Working Group 6 (WG6) of Technical Committee 80 (TC80) of the IEC.

Sections of IEC 61162
Standard IEC 61162 is divided into the following parts:
 Part 1: Single talker and multiple listeners (Also known as NMEA 0183)
 Part 2: Single talker and multiple listeners, high-speed transmission
 Part 3: Serial data instrument network (Also known as NMEA 2000)
 Part 450:  Multiple talkers and multiple listeners–Ethernet interconnection (Also known as Lightweight Ethernet)
 Part 460:  Multiple talkers and multiple listeners - Ethernet interconnection - Safety and security
 
The 61162 standards are all concerning the transport of NMEA sentences, but the IEC
does not define any of these. This is left to the NMEA Organization.

IEC 61162-1
Single talker and multiple listeners
is an international standard

IEC 61162-2
Single talker and multiple listeners, high-speed transmission

IEC 61162-3
Serial data instrument network, multiple talker-multiple listener, prioritized data

IEC 61162-450
Multiple talkers Multiple listeners

This subgroup of TC80/WG6 has specified the use of Ethernet for shipboard navigational networks. The
specification describes the transport of NMEA sentences as defined in 61162-1 over IPv4. Due to
the low amount of protocol complexity it has been nicknamed Lightweight Ethernet or LWE in short.

The historical background and justification for LWE was presented at the ISIS2011 symposium. An overview article of LWE was
given in the December 2010 issue of "Digital Ship"

The standard was published in the first edition 06/2011 . The second edition is in progress(state 05/2016).

IEC 61162-450/460
IEC 61162-460:2015(E) is an add-on to the IEC 61162-450 standard where higher safety and security standards are needed, e.g. due to higher exposure to external threats or to improve network integrity. This standard provides requirements and test methods for equipment to be used in an IEC 61162-460 compliant network as well as requirements for the network itself and requirements for interconnection from the network to other networks. This standard also contains requirements for a redundant IEC 61162-460 compliant network. This standard extends the informative guidance given in Annex D of IEC 61162-450:2011. It does not introduce new application level protocol requirements to those that are defined in IEC 61162-450. 

The first edition was published in 08/2015.

state 05/2016 the first bridge and system manufacturers beginning with the implementation of IEC 61162-450 and IEC 61162-460 

known devices with -450 implementation :
Cobham SAILOR AIS 
Cobham SAILOR GNSS 
Cobham SAILOR NAVTEX 
Danelec VDR 
Furuno GPS
Furuno ECDIS 
Furuno VDR 
Ixblue ECDIS
Ixblue Netans (Full Naval Data Distribution solution)
Navmaster ECDIS
Netwave NW6000 SOLAS Voyage Data Recorder (VDR) 
Saab AIS
Totem Plus ECDIS
Totem Plus VDR 2014
Veinland NMEA Matrix ( bidirectional 8 Port Multiplexer / Converter )
Inclinometer
SATURN Gyrocompass
Norwegian Electric Systems RAVEN INS
Weidmueller modular I/O system u-remote 

known devices/systems with -460 implementation :
Veinland marine approved network switch MagicNet  ( IEC 61162-460 Switch/Forwarder)
Veinland marine approved network gateway MagicNet-GWR (IEC 61162-460 Gateway)
Chartworld eChart Secure (IEC 61162-460 Gateway)

References

External links 
 Official IEC website
 TC80
 

61162
Electronic engineering